Mellon Tytell (born 1945) is an American photographer. She has been published in National Geographic, Time, Life, People, Stern, GEO, Fortune, Playboy and Photo.

Published works

The Beat Book Contributed photographs. (Mulch Press, 1974)
Ecstasy Contributed photographic narrative. (Playboy Press, 1976)
The Houdini of Photography Article on photographer Weegee (Camera Arts Magazine, 1981)
Scopophilia, edited by Gerard Malanga Illustrated interview. (Alfred Van Der Marck, 1986)
Paradise Outlaws John and Mellon Tytell (William Morrow, 1999)
Rolling Stone Book of the Beats Edited by Holly George-Warren. Contributed essay on Robert Frank, and selection of photographs. (Hyperion, 1999)
Ginsberg's Farm by Mark McMurray. Contributed photograph. (Caliban Press, 2006)
Punk 365 Edited by Holly George-Warren. Contributed photograph. (Abrams, 2007)
My Lucky Dog (HarperCollins, 2008)

References

External links
http://mellontytell.com/
International Center of Photography - Paradise Outlaws exhibition
National Gallery of Art - Artist Listing

1945 births
Living people
American women photographers